The Roman Catholic Diocese of Niigata (Japanese: カトリック新潟教区 ) is a diocese located in the city of Niigata in the Ecclesiastical province of Tokyo in Japan.

The apparitions of Our Lady of Akita were within its territory and Bishop John Shojiro Ito initially approved the apparitions in 1984.

History
French botanist Father Urbain Faurie was one of the early missionaries to the Niigata area, who arrived in Japan in July 1873.
On August 13, 1912, the Apostolic Prefecture of Niigata was established from part of the Diocese of Hakodate. The first Apostolic Prefect was Msgr. Joseph Reiners S.V.D. of the Society of the Divine Word. On April 16, 1962 the Prefecture was raised to a Diocese; the first bishop was John Shojiro Ito.

In 1984, the Grey Nuns of the Cross (Sisters of Charity of Ottawa) established the Élisabeth Bruyère Convent in the city of Yamagata, where they worked closely with the Missionaries of the Sacred Heart. The sisters' apostolate includes parish ministry, teaching kindergarten, as well as, at the Maria Komakusa Day Care Center. They also minister to the elderly.

On October 25, 2017, Bishop Kikuchi was appointed Archbishop of Tokyo. The See of Niigata became vacant and the Kikuchi was appointed Apostolic Administrator.

Leadership
 Bishops of Niigata
 Paul Daisuke Narui (May 31, 2020 – present)
 Tarcisio Isao Kikuchi (タルチシオ菊地功), S.V.D. (September 20, 2004 – October 25, 2017)
 Francis Keiichi Sato (フランシスコ佐藤敬一), O.F.M. (March 9, 1985 – May 14, 2004)
 John Shojiro Ito (使徒ヨハネ伊藤庄治郎) (April 4, 1962 – March 9, 1985)
 Prefects Apostolic of Niigata 新潟
 John Baptist Tokisuke Noda (ヨハネ・バプティスタ野田時助) (March 13, 1953 – October 11, 1961)
 Peter Magoshiro Matsuoka (ペトロ松岡孫四郎) (1941 – 1953)
 Anton Ceska (アントン・テェスカ), S.V.D. (June 28, 1926 – 1941)
 Joseph Reiners (ヨゼフ・ライネルス), S.V.D. (19 November 1912  – June 28, 1926)

See also
Roman Catholicism in Japan
Our Lady of Akita

References

External links
 GCatholic.org
 Catholic Hierarchy
 

Roman Catholic dioceses in Japan
Roman Catholic dioceses established in 1991
Roman Catholic dioceses and prelatures established in the 20th century
1991 establishments in Japan